Passion Holiday is a 1963 American film written and directed by Wynn Mavis. It starred Bobbi Shaw in an early role.

Cast
Christy Foushee as Cathy
Linda Hall as Anne
Yanka Mann as 
Stella Palma as Betty
Bruce Brown as Frank
Harry Hocker as Harry
Fred Kost as Eddie
Bob Lee as George

External links

Passion Holiday at TCMDB

1963 films
American comedy-drama films
1963 comedy films
1963 drama films
1960s English-language films
1960s American films